Rainaldi is an Italian surname. Notable people with the surname include:

Carlo Rainaldi (1611–1691), Italian Baroque architect
Domenico Rainaldi, Italian Baroque painter
Girolamo Rainaldi (1570–1655), Italian architect
Lidio Rainaldi (1929–2019), American politician

Italian-language surnames
Patronymic surnames
Surnames from given names